'Mundia Jagir'is the most developed town in the Bareilly District of Uttar Pradesh, India. With Well Developed Roads And Infrastructure The Town boast itself as A Leading Economical Zone.

Literacy Rate

Mundia Jageer,  According to Indian Census 2011 is the only town in the region with a Literacy rate of Above 60%.

Key Peoples

The Town Consist Of Many Key People, Which  Includes Ex Chairman(s), Contestants And Leaders Such As,
IRMAQ AHMAD

Shahnawaz Irmaq, 

Chairman Hafiz Iqram(Ex Chairman)
Afzal Qureshi
Mohammad Kaisar (Ex Chairman)

External links
Pin Code: Mundia Jagir, Bareilly at PINcode.org.in

Cities and towns in Bareilly district